The 2023 UEFA Regions' Cup is the 12th edition of the UEFA Regions' Cup, a football competition for amateur teams in Europe organized by UEFA.

Lower Silesia from Poland are the title holders.

Teams
A total of 35 teams will enter the tournament. Clubs/teams from Russia were demonstratively barred from participation.

Associations were ranked according to their UEFA coefficients, computed based on results of the last three seasons (2015, 2017, 2019), to decide on the round their teams entered and their seeding pots in the preliminary and intermediate round draws. The top 35 associations will enter the intermediate round, while the bottom 5 associations (ranked 32–36) will enter the preliminary round.

The draw for the preliminary and intermediate rounds was held on 8 December 2021, 16:00 CET (UTC+1), at the UEFA headquarters in Nyon, Switzerland. The mechanism of the draws for each round was as follows:
In the preliminary round, the five teams were drawn into two groups of two and three without any seeding.
In the intermediate round, the 31 teams were drawn into eight groups of four. Each group contained one team from Pot A, one team from Pot B, one team from Pot C, and either one team from Pot D or one team which advanced from the preliminary round (whose identity was not known at the time of the draw).

For political reasons, teams from Russia and Ukraine would not be drawn in the same group. The hosts for each group in the preliminary and intermediate rounds would be selected after the draw. On 28 February 2022, UEFA suspended all Russian clubs from participating in UEFA competitions. Russia's spot will be replaced by the preliminary round runners-up.

Preliminary round
The winners and the runners-up advance to the intermediate round to join the 30 teams which receive byes to the intermediate round.

Times are CEST (UTC+2), as listed by UEFA (local times, if different, are in parentheses).

Group A

Group B

Final

Intermediate round
The eight group winners advance to the final tournament. The winners of each group qualify for the finals, which in principle will be held in the last two weeks of June 2023, with the hosts to be decided when the qualifiers are known.

Times are CEST (UTC+2), as listed by UEFA (local times, if different, are in parentheses).

Group 1

Group 2

Group 3

Group 4

Group 5

Group 6

Group 7

Group 8
</onlyinclude>

Final tournament
The hosts of the final tournament will be selected by UEFA from the eight qualified teams.

Qualified teams
The following teams qualified for the final tournament.

Top goalscorers
Preliminary round: 
Intermediate round:

References

External links

2019
Regions
June 2022 sports events in Europe
September 2022 sports events in Europe
October 2022 sports events in Europe
June 2023 sports events in Europe